Bret Harte Union High School District is a public school district based in Calaveras County, California. The district serves all or part of Angels Camp, Arnold, Avery, Copperopolis, Douglas Flat, Hathaway Pines, Murphys, and Vallecito.

Schools 

 Bret Harte Union High School(zoned)
 John Vierra High School(alternative)
 Vallecito High School(continuation)

General Information

Feeder Districts 
The district is fed by Mark Twain Union Elementary School DIstrict, and the Vallecito Union School District, which take care of the elementary and junior high level education.

References

External links
 

School districts in Calaveras County, California

Mascot : Bullfrogs